Leagues is an American rock band from Nashville, Tennessee that formed in 2013. The band are made up of Thad Cockrell and Jeremy Lutito. They released their first studio album in 2013 entitled You Belong Here that was released by Bufalotone Records. The album saw commercial charting successes, and it garnered positive reception from music critics.

Background
The band started on January 29, 2013, with members Thad Cockrell on lead vocals, former Audio Adrenaline guitarist Tyler Burkum on guitars, Mike Simons on bass guitar, and drummer and former Jars of Clay touring member Jeremy Lutito. In 2013, the band signed with Bufalotone Records.

They released their debut studio album, You Belong Here on January 29, 2013. For the Billboard charting week of February 16, 2013, the album charted at Nos. 12 and 48 on the Top Heatseekers Albums and Independent Albums charts. The album was met with positive reviews from Knoxville News Sentinel, The Aquarian Weekly, Iowa State Daily, and Indie Vision Music. The album was the No. 7 on "The 10 Best Albums of 2013" by Relevant.

Burkum left the band to rejoin Mat Kearney in 2016.

In September 2016, they released their second album, Alone Together''.

Discography
Studio albums

References

External links
 

Indie rock musical groups from Tennessee
Musical groups established in 2013
2013 establishments in Tennessee
Musical groups from Nashville, Tennessee